Yosel Piedra Guillén (born 27 March 1994), also known as Josel Piedra, is a Cuban football player who currently plays as a defender for Asociación Deportiva San Carlos in Costa Rica and the Cuba national team.

International career
Piedra represented Cuba at the 2011 CONCACAF U-17 Championship, playing two games as Cuba were knocked out. His next taste of international football was with the under 20 squad at the 2013 FIFA U-20 World Cup in Turkey, where he made three appearances as Cuba was once again knocked out in the group stage. He featured in Cuba's unsuccessful qualification for the 2016 Summer Olympics, playing in all three games. He made his debut for the senior side in December 2015, in a 5-0 friendly thrashing by Nicaragua.

Career statistics

International

References

External links
 
 Yosel Piedra at FIFA

Living people
1994 births
Cuban footballers
Cuba international footballers
Cuba youth international footballers
Association football defenders
FC Villa Clara players
FC Ciego de Ávila players
Universidad de San Carlos players
Cuban expatriate footballers
Cuban expatriate sportspeople in Guatemala
Expatriate footballers in Guatemala
2019 CONCACAF Gold Cup players
People from Santa Clara, Cuba